Leuculodes lephassa is a moth in the Doidae family. It was described by Druce in 1897. It is found in Mexico.

The fore- and hindwings are semihyaline white, the former with the costal margin slightly yellowish. The head and antenna are yellowish-white and the thorax, abdomen and legs white.

References

Moths described in 1897
Doidae